"Keep On Lovin' Me Honey" is a 1968 hit written and produced by Nickolas Ashford & Valerie Simpson, and issued as a single on Motown Records' Tamla label by Marvin Gaye and Tammi Terrell. It was the third release from the duo's You're All I Need album.
Billboard described the single as a "potent, driving rocker" that "will put [Gaye and Terrell] rapidly at the top."  Cash Box said that it "blazes its way with terrific rhythmic impact and super-powered vocal splendor."

Chart performance
Released a few months after the success of "You're All I Need to Get By", the song performed more modestly than that song, but still charted into the Billboard Hot 100's Top 40. "Keep On Lovin' Me Honey" peaked at number twenty-four on the chart, while reaching number eleven on the R&B singles chart.

Personnel
All vocals by Marvin Gaye and Tammi Terrell
Written and produced by Nickolas Ashford & Valerie Simpson
Instrumentation by The Funk Brothers

References

1968 singles
Marvin Gaye songs
Tammi Terrell songs
Songs written by Valerie Simpson
Songs written by Nickolas Ashford
Male–female vocal duets
Song recordings produced by Ashford & Simpson
1968 songs
Tamla Records singles